Gürkan Sermeter (born 14 February 1974) is a Swiss former footballer who last played for AC Bellinzona in the Swiss Challenge League.

External links
 Statistics at T-Online.de 
 AC Bellinzona profile 
 

1974 births
Swiss men's footballers
Living people
FC Aarau players
Grasshopper Club Zürich players
BSC Young Boys players
FC Luzern players
AC Bellinzona players
Swiss Super League players
Swiss Challenge League players
Association football midfielders